Chiaroscuro Records is a jazz record company and label founded by Hank O'Neal in 1970. The label's name comes from the art term for the use of light and dark in a painting. O'Neal came up with the name via his friend and mentor Eddie Condon, a jazz musician who performed in what were called Chiaroscuro Concerts in the 1930s. O'Neal also got the name from a store that sold only black and white dresses.

O'Neal ran the label from 1969–1977 and produced all but two of the albums. Its catalogue included Earl Hines, Joe Venuti, Teddy Wilson, and Ruby Braff.

O'Neal sold the label to Audiophile Enterprises in 1978, then bought back the catalogue when he started SOS Productions in 1987. Chiaroscuro released new discs and reissues through the 1990s.

In 2011, Chiaroscuro's founders donated the company to the Northeast Pennsylvania Educational Television Association, owner of WVIA-FM-TV, the PBS and NPR member for northeastern Pennsylvania. WVIA-FM used Chiaroscuro's library to start an all-jazz station on its third HD subcarrier.

Artists

Nat Adderley
Howard Alden
George Barnes
Louie Bellson
Borah Bergman
Gene Bertoncini
Eubie Blake
Ruby Braff
John Bunch
Don Cherry
Buck Clayton
Eddie Condon
Johnny Costa
Kenny Davern
Wild Bill Davison
Lou Donaldson
Dorothy Donegan
John Eaton
Don Ewell
Bud Freeman
Don Friedman
Dexter Gordon
Al Grey
Bobby Hackett
Antonio Hart
Woody Herman
Earl Hines
Milt Hinton
Claude Hopkins
Dick Hyman
Ahmad Jamal
Gus Johnson
Henry Johnson
Dill Jones
Mike Jones
Roger Kellaway
Stacey Kent
Brooks Kerr
Lee Konitz
Jay Leonhart
Adam Makowicz
Junior Mance
Dave McKenna
Jay McShann
Michael Moore
Sam Morrison
Gerry Mulligan
Flip Phillips
Mel Powell
Zoot Sims
Willie "The Lion" Smith
Soprano Summit
Jess Stacy
Lou Stein
Ralph Sutton
Buddy Tate
Clark Terry
Joe Turner
Joe Venuti
Dick Wellstood
Bob Wilber
Jack Wilkins
Mary Lou Williams
Teddy Wilson
George Young

Discography

CR101 Earl Hines: Quintessential Recording Session (1970)
CR103 Mary Lou Williams: From the Heart
CR105 Bobby Hackett: Live At the Roosevelt Grill (Vol. 1) (1970)
CR106 Don Ewell: Solo Piano 1967-1973 (1970)
CR109 Dick Wellstood: From Ragtime On
CR110 Eddie Condon: Live at the New School (1973)
CR111 Teddy Wilson: With Billie in Mind (1972)
CR112 Dill Jones: Davenport Blues
CR113 Eddie Condon: Town Hall Concerts, Vol. 2 (reissue of material from 1944 concerts)
CR116 Earl Hines: An Evening with Earl Hines
CR117 Ruby Braff & Ellis Larkins: The Grand Reunion
CR118 Earl Hines & Jonah Jones: Back on the Street
CR119 Dave McKenna: Solo Piano
CR120 Earl Hines: Quintessential Continued
CR121 The Ruby Braff-George Barnes Quartet
CR123 Buddy Tate: Buddy Tate and His Buddies (1973)
CR124 Wild Bill Davison at the Rainbow Room
CR125 Borah Bergman: Discovery (1975)
CR126 The Ruby Braff-George Barnes Quartet: Live at the New School (1974)
CR127 Don Ewell: Take it in Stride
CR128 Joe Venuti & Zoot Sims: Joe & Zoot (1974)
CR129 Dick Wellstood: Dick Wellstood and His All Star Orchestra Featuring Kenny Davern
CR132 Buck Clayton Jam Session
CR133 Jess Stacy: Jess Stacy Still Swings (1974)
CR134 Joe Venuti Blue Four (1974)
CR136 Dave McKenna Quartet Featuring Zoot Sims
CR138 Bobby Hackett: Live at the Roosevelt Grill
CR139 Dick Wellstood: Live at the Cookery
CR140 National Jazz Ensemble: 1975-1976
CR141 Tarika Blue: The Blue Path (1976)
CR142 Joe Venuti And Zoot Sims (1975)
CR143 Buck Clayton Jam Session
CR144 John Bunch Plays Kurt Weill
CR145 Joe Venuti & Earl Hines: Hot Sonatas
CR146 Mary Lou Williams: Live at the Cookery
CR147 Joe Turner: King of Stride
CR148 Bob Wilber and Kenny Davern: Soprano Summit
CR149 Lou Stein: Tribute to Tatum
CR150 Teddy Wilson and his All Stars (1976)
CR152 Buck Clayton Jam Session, Vol. 3: Jazz Party Time
CR153 Joe Venuti: Hooray for Joe!
CR154 Eddie Condon: In Japan (1964)
CR155 Gerry Mulligan: Idol Gossip (1977)
CR156 Jack Wilkins: Merge (1977)
CR157 Earl Hines: At the New School
CR158 Borah Bergman: Bursts of Joy (1976)
CR159 Willie "The Lion" Smith: Relaxin' 
CR160 Dave McKenna, Joe Venuti: Alone at the palace
CR161 Bobby Hackett: Live at the Roosevelt Grill
CR162 Dick Hyman: Fats Waller's Heavenly Jive (1977)
CR163 Buck Clayton Jam Session, Vol. 4: Jay Hawk
CR164 Tarika Blue: Tarika Blue
CR165 Buddy Tate and Dollar Brand: Buddy Tate Meets Dollar Brand (1977)
CR166 Lee Konitz: The Lee Konitz Quintet
CR167 Eddie Condon: Live at Eddie Condon's
CR168 Teddy Wilson Revamps Rodgers & Hart
CR169 Earl Hines Quartet
CR170 Jazz Piano Masters: Teddy Wilson, Claude Hopkins, Dill Jones, Eubie Blake (1972)
CR171 Bob Wilber and the Scott Hamilton Quintet
CD172: Six By Six: Synthesis
CR173 Lou Stein & Ray McKinley: Stompin' 'Em Down (1977)
CR174 John Eaton: It Seems Like Old Times (1977)
CR175 Dave McKenna: Fingers (1977)
CD176: Max Kaminsky: When Summer is Gone
CR177 Jess Stacy: Still Swingin' 
CR178 Soprano Summit: Crazy Rhythm
CR179 Bobby Hackett: Live At the Roosevelt Grill (Vol. 4)
CR186 Lee Konitz: Lee Konitz Nonet
CR187 Abdullah Ibrahim: The Journey (1977)
CR188 Milt Hinton, Bobby Rosengarden and Hank Jones: The Trio
CR199 Kenny Davern & Flip Phillips: John & Joe
CR200 Earl Hines in New Orleans (1977)
CR202 Dave McKenna (1977)
CR203 Ruby Braff & Woody Herman: It Had to Be Us
CR205 Johnny Costa: Classic Costa
CR206 Ralph Sutton and Jay McShann: Last of the Whorehouse Piano Players (1979)
CR207 Gene Krupa: Live at the New School
CR208 Ralph Sutton and Kenny Davern: Ralph Sutton and Kenny Davern
CR209 Adam Makowicz: A Handful of Stars (1981)
CR210 Dick Wellstood: Solo Piano
CR211 Ralph Sutton and Ruby Braff: R&R
CR212 Clark Terry & The Young Titans of Jazz: Live at Marihan's
CR218 The Chiaroscuro Songbook: Vocal Compilation (Volume 1)
CR219 Milt Hinton: The Judge At His Best
CR221 The Jesse Green Trio: Sylvan Treasure
CR222 Milt Hinton: The Basement Tapes
CR223 For Dancers Only: A Lindy Hop Compilation
CR301 Mel Powell with Benny Carter: The Return of Mel Powell
CR302 Lilette Jenkins with Doc Cheatham: The Music of Lil Hardin Armstrong
CR303 Howard Alden and Jack Lesberg: No Amps Allowed
CR304 John Eaton: Indiana On Our Minds
CR305 Al Grey: The New Al Grey Quintet
CR306 Ralph Sutton and Jay McShann: Last of the Whorehouse Piano Players (1989)
CR307 George Young with Lew DelGatto: Old Times
CR308 Gene Bertoncini and Michael Moore: Two in Time
CR309 Clark Terry Spacemen: Squeeze Me!
CR310 Milt Hinton: Old Man Time
CR311 Bob Wilber and Kenny Davern: Summit Reunion (1989)
CR312 Dorothy Donegan Trio: Live At The Floating Jazz Festival (1990)
CR313 Al Grey: Live at the Floating Jazz Festival (1990)
CR314 Flip Phillips: The Claw (1986)
CR315 Roger Kellaway: Roger Kellaway meets Gene Bertoncini and Michael Moore
CR316 Jon Gordon: The Jon Gordon Quartet
CR317 Johnny Costa: Flying Fingers
CR318 Dorothy Donegan Trio: Live with Dizzy Gillespie (1991)
CR319 Jesse Green: Lift Off
CR320 Jay McShann: Some Blues
CR321 Flip Phillips: Try A Little Tenderness
CR322 Derek Smith, Milt Hinton and Bobby Rosengarden: The Trio
CR323 Dorothy Donegan Trio: Live with Clark Terry
CR324 Bob Wilber and Kenny Davern: Summit Reunion (1992)
CR325 Mike Jones: Oh! Look At Me Now
CR326 Bill Charlap Trio: Along With Me
CR327 Flip Phillips: At The Helm
CR328 Jesse Green: Sea Journey
CR329 Louie Bellson Quintet: Salute
CR330 Jon Gordon: Spark
CR331 The Junior Mance Trio: Blue Mance
CR332 A Chiaroscuro Christmas
CR333 John Eaton: Solo Piano
CR334 Nat Adderley Quintet: Live (1994)
CR335 Johnny Costa: Costa Plays Gershwin
CR336 Mike Jones: Runnin' Wild
CR337 Terry Gibbs: Play That Song
CR338 Urbie Green Quintet: Sea Jam Blues
CR339 Bob Wilber and Kenny Davern: Yellow Dog Blues
CR340 Junior Mance, Keter Betts and Jackie Williams: The FJF Trio
CR341 Johnny Costa: Dream
CR342 The Soft Winds: Then and Now 1946-1996
CR343 Gene Bertoncini: Jobim - Someone To Light Up My Life
CR344 Kenny Davern and Flip Phillips: Spanish Eyes
CR345 Jay McShann: My Baby With The Black Dress On
CR346 John Eaton: Live At Steinway Hall
CR347 Clark Terry Quintet: Top And Bottom
CR348 Red Holloway Quartet: Live
CR349 Bill Charlap and Ted Rosenthal: The Gerry Mulligan Songbook
CR350 Frank Wess Quartet: Surprise, Surprise
CR351 Virginia Mayhew: Nini Green
CR352 Junior Mance: The FJF Trio with Joe Temperley (1996)
CR353 Jay Leonhart: Great Duos
CR354 Gene Bertoncini: Live
CR355 John Bunch, Bucky Pizzarelli and Jay Leonhart: NY Swing
CR356 Terry Gibbs and Buddy DeFranco: WHAM!
CR357 The Jay McShann Trio: Hootie!
CR358 The Johnny Frigo Quartet: Live at the Floating Jazz Festival
CR359 Junior Mance: The Floating Jazz Festival Trio
CR360 The Sean Smith Quartet: Live!
CR361 The Red Holloway Quintet: Standing Room Only
CR362 Gene Bertoncini and Jack Wilkins: Just the Two of Us
CR363 Junior Mance's Floating Jazz Festival Trio: Mance
CR364 Mike Jones: Live at Steinway Hall
CR365 The Clark Terry Quintet: Live on the QE2
CR366 The Lou Donaldson Quartet: Relaxing at Sea: Live on the QE2
CR367 The Henry Johnson Quartet: An Evening at Sea
CR368 Phil Woods: Voyage
CR369 Kenny Davern and Joe Temperley: Live at the Floating Jazz Festival
CR370 The Junior Mance Trio: Music of Thelonious Monk
CR371 Jack Wilkins: Reunion
CR372 The John Bunch Trio: Tony's Tunes
CR373 Dave Glasser: Begin Again
CR375 Mike Jones: Stretches Out
CR376 Don Friedman: Hot House
CR377 John Bunch: An English Songbook
CR378 Mike Jones Trio: Live at the Green Mill
CR400 Bill Mays Inventions Trio: Life's A Movie
CR401 Phil Woods and the Festival Orchestra: New Celebration
CR2003 Louis Armstrong and the Dukes of Dixieland: Great Alternatives
CR2004 Dollar Brand: Cape Town Fringe
CR2007 Eddie Locke: Jivin' with the Refugees from Hastings Street
CR2028 Ted Curson: Snake Johnson
CR2029 Dexter Gordon: Jive Fernando
CR2037 Eddie Harris: Exploration (1983)

References

External links
Official site

American record labels
Jazz record labels